Yoshi is a video game series of platform games and puzzle games that is a spin-off of the Super Mario series published and produced by the Japanese gaming company Nintendo. The games have been developed by a variety of developers including Nintendo, Game Freak, Intelligent Systems, Artoon, its successor Arzest, Good-Feel and Bullet-Proof Software. Yoshi games have been released for Nintendo video game consoles and handhelds dating from the Nintendo Entertainment System (NES) to the current generation of video game consoles. Some of the original NES and Super Nintendo Entertainment System (SNES) games have been ported to Game Boy Advance or the Virtual Console (both, in the case of Super Mario World).

The series revolves around Yoshi, a green dinosaur character. He was first introduced in the SNES game released in 1990, Super Mario World, where Mario and Luigi can ride on him. The antagonists of the series are Baby Bowser, the young king of the Koopas, and Kamek, a Magikoopa who was Bowser's caretaker as a child. 

The first Yoshi game was the Nintendo Entertainment System puzzle game released in 1991, Yoshi, which was developed by Game Freak. The first game in what is considered the main series, as well as the first to feature Yoshi in a playable main-character role, is the game released in 1995, Super Mario World 2: Yoshi's Island, which introduces the universe staples which are used in many following games. These staples include colorful storybook graphics, and several gameplay elements.

Yoshi's Story, released for the Nintendo 64 in 1997, took a more puzzle orientated approach was later followed by the spin-offs Yoshi's Universal Gravitation and Yoshi Touch & Go, released on the Game Boy Advance and DS respectively. The next mainline game in the series was Yoshi's Woolly World, originally released for the Wii U in 2015 and later the 3DS in 2017. The latest game, Yoshi's Crafted World, was released for the Nintendo Switch in 2019.

Video games

Main series

Spin-offs

Cancelled games

Reception 

In the Yoshi series, as of 2021, Super Mario World 2: Yoshi's Island is the most well-received entry, with a score of 91 in the review agreggator website Metacritic.

Notes

References 

Video game franchises
Yoshi
Yoshi video games
Yoshi